Communications in the Turks and Caicos Islands

Telephone
Telephones - main lines in use: 3,000 (1994)

Telephones - mobile cellular: 0 (1994)

Telephone system: fair cable and radiotelephone services
domestic: NA
international: 2 submarine cables; satellite earth station - 1 Intelsat (Atlantic Ocean)

Radio
Radio broadcast stations: AM 3 (one inactive), FM 6, shortwave 0 (1998)
A partial list of AM/FM/SW stations in the Turks and Caicos Islands is provided below:

AM Radio:

 530 Radio Visión Cristiana
 VHT 1460 (formerly VSI)

FM Radio:
 ZISP-FM 88.1 Smooth FM
 ZGCI-FM 88.3 GCI Broadcasting
 ZI??-FM 88.5 Connolly Productions Company
 ZIDG-FM 88.7 88 Jamz - D & D Ewing Communications Ltd. 88.7 / 98.9
 ZRTC-FM 89.1 Radio Turks and Caicos (Cockburn Town; formerly 107.7 until June 2018)
 ZRTC-1 89.1 Radio Turks and Caicos (Cockburn Town; formerly 101.9 until June 2018)
 ZRTC-2 89.1 Radio Turks and Caicos (Providenciales; formerly 103.9 until June 2018)
 ZWIV-1 89.3 Coral Radio 1 (WIV)
 ZHPE 89.7 Hope Radio
 ZWIV-2 89.9 Coral Radio 2 (WIV)
 ZIPH-FM 90.5 90.5 Praise Him FM
 ZISN-FM 91.1 91.1 Sun FM Sun Media
 ZIPW-FM 92.5 92.5 Power FM
 ZIIS-FM 93.9 93.9 Island FM
 ZIKB-FM 94.7 KIST 95
 ZIKC-FM 95.1 KIST 95
 ZVIC-FM 96.7 VIC - Victory in Christ Radio
 ZIHP-FM 96.9 House on the Rock Ministries
 ZIAP-FM 98.3 Abundant Life Ministries
 ZIDP-FM 98.9 ROJ - Rock of Jesus
 ZIKS-FM 99.9 Kiss FM
 ZIWV-3 102.5 WIV Radio
 ZITR-FM 104.5 Tradewinds Radio TCI
 ZIBF-FM 105.5 / 103.5 ZIBF, Life Radio
 ZRTP-FM 105.9 RTC 105.9
 ZIKP-FM 106.3 KIST 106.3

Shortwave:
 VSI-8 4780 kHz
 VSI-35 8000 kHz
Defunct:

 1020 Caribbean Christian Radio (1995-1998) (call-sign unknown at this time)
 1020 SuperPower 1020 (call-sign unknown at this time)
 1570 Atlantic Beacon (call-sign unknown at this time)
 Hope Radio 89.7 (call-sign unknown at this time)
 VHTC-FM 91.5
 TCI Baptist Union 94.7 (call-sign unknown at this time)
 VHT-FM 101.9 (formerly VSI-FM)
 ZIBS-FM 107.1
Radios: 8,000 (1997)

Television
Television broadcast stations: 2

WIV Cable has been operating on the islands for over 10 years (Channel 4)

New to Turks & Caicos, TCeyeTV started broadcasting on 3 July 2007

broadcasts from The Bahamas are also received; cable television is established) (1997)

Internet
Internet Service Providers (ISPs): 3 (2013)
 LIME (ADSL)
 WIV (DSL)
 Islandcom (4G)

Country code (Top level domain): TC

External links
 The Turks & Caicos Islands Telecommunications Commission
 The Turks and Caicos Islands, SubmarineCableMap.com

References 

Turks and Caicos Islands
 
Turks